The team free routine competition at 2013 World Aquatics Championships was held on July 23–26 with the preliminary round on July 23 and the final on July 26.

Results
The preliminary round was held on July 23 at 18:00 and the final at 19:00 on July 26.

Green denotes finalists

References

Synchronised swimming at the 2013 World Aquatics Championships